Stu Martin may refer to:

Stu Martin (baseball) (1912–1997), Major League Baseball player
Stu Martin (drummer) (1938–1980), American jazz drummer